Jeremy Robert Powell (born June 18, 1976) is an American former professional baseball player. He is currently the pitching coach for the AAA New Orleans Baby Cakes. He played for the Montreal Expos in Major League Baseball (MLB).

Career

Montreal Expos
Powell was drafted out of high school by the Montreal Expos in the 4th round of the 1994 Major League Baseball draft and assigned to the Rookie-level Gulf Coast Expos. In  with the Low-A Vermont Expos, he made 15 starts and had an ERA of 4.34. He also made one start for Single-A Albany, giving up 1 run in 6 innings and getting the win. With West Palm Beach, he recorded 121 strikeouts and a 3.02 ERA. In  with the Double-A Harrisburg Senators, he went 9-7 with an ERA of 3.00 and was promoted to the major leagues for the first time after the All-Star Break.

Powell made his major league debut on July 23, 1998, but lost despite giving up only 1 run in 6 innings. He made 6 more appearances for the Expos and ended the season with a major league ERA of 7.92. He began  with Triple-A Ottawa and posted a 2.97 ERA in 16 starts. This earned him a midseason promotion, and he spent the rest of the season in the majors. He made 17 starts for the Expos with perhaps his best being 8 shutout innings against the San Diego Padres on August 9. In , he struggled in both the majors and minors. With Ottawa, Powell went 5-13 with a 6.91 ERA in 25 games. With Montreal, he went 0-3 with a 7.96 ERA in 11 games. He became a free agent after the season, and signed with the San Diego Padres.

Powell was assigned to the minor leagues to begin , but after going 4-2 with a 1.59 ERA and a .77 WHIP in 11 starts, he went to Japan to play.

Buffaloes
He signed with the Osaka Kintetsu Buffaloes of Nippon Professional Baseball where after a shaky first season, he became one of NPB's most successful pitchers. He played for the Buffaloes through , winning 17, 14, and 8 games in his last three seasons with them. 

In , the Buffaloes merged with the Orix Bluewave to form the Orix Buffaloes. Powell won 14 games and pitched 200 innings in 2005.

Yomiuri Giants
In 2006, he joined the Yomiuri Giants after the season. With Yomiuri for two seasons, he went only 10-12 after missing most of the  season.

Fukuoka SoftBank Hawks
In , he joined the Fukuoka SoftBank Hawks, but went 2-6 in 12 starts.

Pittsburgh Pirates
In January 2009, Powell left Hawks and signed a minor league contract with the Pittsburgh Pirates.
 
He was the pitching coach for the Greensboro Grasshoppers.

As Coach
As of 2018, he is currently the pitching coach for the AAA, New Orleans Baby Cakes.

References

External links

Japanese Profile

1976 births
Living people
Albany Polecats players
American expatriate baseball players in Canada
American expatriate baseball players in Japan
Baseball coaches from California
Baseball players from California
Delmarva Shorebirds players
Fukuoka SoftBank Hawks players
Gulf Coast Expos players
Harrisburg Senators players
Indianapolis Indians players
Major League Baseball pitchers
Minor league baseball coaches
Montreal Expos players
Nippon Professional Baseball pitchers
Orix Buffaloes players
Osaka Kintetsu Buffaloes players
Ottawa Lynx players
Portland Beavers players
Vermont Expos players
West Palm Beach Expos players
Yomiuri Giants players